Ignatius Loyola Donnelly (November 3, 1831 – January 1, 1901) was an American Congressman, populist writer, and fringe scientist. He is known primarily now for his fringe theories concerning Atlantis, Catastrophism (especially the idea of an ancient impact event affecting ancient civilizations), and Shakespearean authorship. Even though many modern historians consider it to be pseudoscience and pseudohistory, recent discoveries at Gobekli Tepe in Turkey of an ancient catastrophe and recent scientific discoveries of an large impact event provide some credence to his theories . Donnelly's work corresponds to the writings of late-19th and early-20th century figures such as Helena Blavatsky, Rudolf Steiner, and James Churchward.

Life and career
Donnelly was the son of Philip Carrol Donnelly, an immigrant from Fintona, County Tyrone, Ireland who had settled in Philadelphia, Pennsylvania,. His sister was the writer Eleanor C. Donnelly. On June 29, 1826, Philip had married Catherine Gavin, who was the daughter of John Gavin, also an immigrant from  Fintona, County Tyrone, Ireland
After starting as a peddler, Philip studied medicine at the Philadelphia College of Medicine. He later contracted typhus from a patient and died at age 31, leaving his wife with five children.

Catherine provided for her children by operating a pawn shop. Ignatius, her youngest son, was admitted to the prestigious Central High School, the second oldest public high school in the United States. There he studied under the presidency of John S. Hart, excelling primarily in literature.

Donnelly decided to become a lawyer and became a clerk for Benjamin Brewster, who later became Attorney General of the United States. Donnelly was admitted to the bar in 1852. In 1855, he married Katherine McCaffrey, with whom he had three children. In 1855, he resigned his clerkship, entered politic with campaign speeches for Democratic candidates, and participated in communal home building schemes. He quit the Catholic Church sometime in the 1850s and thereafter was never active in any religious group.

Donnelly moved to the Minnesota Territory in 1857 amidst rumors of a financial scandal, and there he settled in Dakota County. He initiated a utopian community called Nininger City, together with several partners. However, the Panic of 1857 doomed the attempt at a cooperative farm and community and left Donnelly deeply in debt.

His wife Katherine died in 1894. In 1898, he married his secretary, Marian Hanson.

Donnelly died on January 1, 1901, in Minneapolis, Minnesota, age 69 years. He is buried at Calvary Cemetery in St. Paul, Minnesota. His personal papers are archived at the Minnesota Historical Society.

Political and literary career

Donnelly entered politics, this time as a Republican, with two unsuccessful campaigns for the state legislature (1857, 1858). Though he was not elected, Donnelly was recognized as a highly effective political speaker, which led to a successful campaign for lieutenant governor, which he held from 1860 to 1863. He was a Radical Republican Congressman from Minnesota in the 38th, 39th, and 40th congresses, (1863–1869), a state senator from 1874–1878 and 1891–1894 and a state representative from 1887–1888 and 1897–1898. As a legislator, he advocated extending the powers of the Freedmen's Bureau to provide education for freedmen so that they could protect themselves once the bureau was withdrawn. Donnelly was also an early supporter of women's suffrage. After leaving the Minnesota State Senate in 1878, he returned to his law practice and writing.

In 1877, Donnelly spoke at a meeting of 10,000 people where he read his preamble to the conference platform. The document of 12 short paragraphs, as altered slightly for the party's first nominating convention in Omaha that July, was the pithiest and soon became the most widely-circulated statement of the Populist credo. Donnelly talked about the corruption of politics and voting, newspapers giving out false and biased material, and how the Populists needed to take back the country that was their own.

In 1882, he published Atlantis: The Antediluvian World, his best-known work. It details theories concerning the mythical lost continent of Atlantis. The book sold well and is widely credited with initiating the theme of Atlantis as an antediluvian civilization that became such a feature of popular literature during the 20th century and contributed to the emergence of Mayanism. Donnelly suggested that Atlantis, whose story was told by Plato in the dialogues of Timaeus and Critias, had been destroyed during the same event remembered in the Bible as the Great Flood.  He cited research on the ancient Maya civilization by Charles Étienne Brasseur de Bourbourg and Augustus Le Plongeon, claiming that it had been the place of a common origin of ancient civilizations in Africa, especially ancient Egypt), Europe, and the Americas. He also thought that it had been the original home of an Aryan race whose red-haired, blue-eyed descendants could be found in Ireland. It is believed that Ireland was the ''Garden of Phoebus'' (Hyperborea) of the  Western  mythologists.

A year after Atlantis, he published Ragnarok: The Age of Fire and Gravel, in which he expounded his belief that the Flood, as well as the destruction of Atlantis and the extinction of the mammoth, had been brought about by the near-collision of the earth with a massive comet. This book also sold well, and both books seem to have had an important influence on the development of Immanuel Velikovsky's controversial ideas half a century later.

In 1888, he published The Great Cryptogram in which he proposed that Shakespeare's plays had been written by Francis Bacon, an idea that was popular during the late 19th and early 20th century. He then traveled to England to arrange the English publication of his book by Sampson Low, speaking at the Oxford (and Cambridge) Union in which his thesis "Resolved, that the works of William Shakespeare were composed by Francis Bacon" was put to an unsuccessful vote. The book was a complete failure, and Donnelly was discredited.

Donnelly also made several other campaigns for public office during the 1880s. He made a losing campaign for Congress, this time as a Democrat, in 1884. In 1887, he successfully campaigned for a seat in the Minnesota State Legislature as an independent. During this period, he was also an organizer of the Minnesota Farmers' Alliance.

In 1892, Donnelly wrote the preamble of the People's Party's Omaha Platform for the presidential campaign of that year. He was nominated for Vice President of the United States in 1900 by the People's Party, also known as the Populist Party. The People's Party was a development of the National Farmers' Alliance, and had a platform that demanded the abandonment of the gold standard and later for the adoption of free silver, the abolition of national banks, a graduated income tax, a direct election of senators, civil service reform, and an eight-hour day. That year, Donnelly also campaigned for governor of Minnesota but was defeated.

The People's Party protested the railroad companies corrupting government and advocated government regulation of the railroads. Donnelly had a key leadership role in this party, yet he received $10,000 from the Lake Superior and Mississippi Railroad Company.

State park
During the 1930s, an organization was formed to lobby for the creation of a state park at Donnelly's home at Nininger near Hastings, Minnesota. The house was still standing in 1939, but the effort failed and the house has since been demolished.

Reception
Donnelly's writings on Atlantis have been rejected by scholars and scientists. He has been described as a crank and pseudoscience promoter.

Gordon Stein has noted that "most of what Donnelly said was highly questionable or downright wrong."

Works
His books include:
The Mourner's Vision: A Poem (1850), a long poem he wrote at the age of 18.
Atlantis: The Antediluvian World (1882), in which he attempted to establish that all known ancient civilizations were descended from its high-Neolithic culture.
 Ragnarok: The Age of Fire and Gravel (1883), in which he proposed that a comet hit the earth in prehistoric times and destroyed a high civilization.
 The Shakespeare Myth (1887)
 Essay on the Sonnets of Shakespeare
 The Great Cryptogram: Francis Bacon's Cipher in Shakespeare's Plays (1888), in which he maintained he had discovered codes in the works of Shakespeare indicating that their true author was Francis Bacon.
 Caesar's Column (1890), a science fiction novel set during 1988 about a worker revolt against a global oligarchy. (Published under the pseudonym of Edmund Boisgilbert.)
 Doctor Huguet: A Novel (1891) (Published under the pseudonym of Edmund Boisgilbert.)
 The Golden Bottle or the Story of Ephraim Benezet of Kansas (1892)
 The Bryan Campaign for the American People's Money (1896)
 The Cipher in the Plays, and on the Tombstone (1899)

References

Sources
 Bovee, John (1969). 'Doctor Huguet:  Donnelly on Being Black', Minnesota History, vol. 41 (no. 6), pp. 286–94.
 William Friedman and Elizebeth Friedman, The Shakespearean ciphers examined, Cambridge University Press, 1957.  Chapter III.
 Hicks, JD (1921). 'The Political Career of Ignatius Donnelly', Mississippi Valley Historical Review, vol. 8, pp. 80–132.
 Ridge, M (1962). Ignatius Donnelly: The Portrait of a Politician, Chicago: University of Chicago Press, reprinted 1991 by Minnesota Historical Society Press.
  in the Biographical Directory of the United States Congress

External links

 Ignatius Donnelly: Paranoid progressive in the Gilded Age 
 Ignatius Donnelly in MNopedia, the Minnesota Encyclopedia 
 The Ignatius Donnelly and Family Papers are available for research use at the Minnesota Historical Society
 
 
 
 Donnelly's influence on 19th-Century Australia
 
 

1831 births
1901 deaths
1900 United States vice-presidential candidates
19th-century American novelists
19th-century American politicians
American male novelists
American people of Irish descent
American science fiction writers
American suffragists
American former Christians
Atlantis proponents
Baconian theory of Shakespeare authorship
Former Roman Catholics
Lieutenant Governors of Minnesota
Republican Party members of the Minnesota House of Representatives
Minnesota Populists
Republican Party Minnesota state senators
People from Dakota County, Minnesota
Politicians from Philadelphia
Pseudoarchaeologists
Pseudohistorians
Republican Party members of the United States House of Representatives from Minnesota
Shakespeare authorship theorists
Central High School (Philadelphia) alumni